Siah-Kaman ( meaning black bow) is a mountain in the Takht-e Suleyman Massif, Alborz mountain range, north of Iran.

See also
 List of Iranian four-thousanders

References

Mountains of Iran
Mountains of Mazandaran Province